Anisoneura salebrosa is a moth of the family Noctuidae first described by Achille Guenée in 1852. It is found in Taiwan, Thailand, Vietnam, Sumatra, Peninsular Malaysia, Borneo, Sulawesi, the north-eastern part of the Himalayas (Nepal and India), Bangladesh, China, Japan and the Philippines.

References

Moths described in 1852
Catocalinae
Moths of Asia